Delaware Avenue could refer to:
 Delaware Avenue in Philadelphia, PA
 Delaware Avenue of Albany, NY